Palle Kähler (16 November 1939 – 10 June 2003) was a Danish footballer. He played in two matches for the Denmark national football team in 1964.

References

External links
 

1939 births
2003 deaths
Danish men's footballers
Denmark international footballers
Association footballers not categorized by position